Two-Fisted Rangers is a 1939 American Western film directed by Joseph H. Lewis and written by Fred Myton. The film stars Charles Starrett, Iris Meredith, Bob Nolan, Kenneth MacDonald, Dick Curtis and Wally Wales. The film was released on December 13, 1939, by Columbia Pictures.

Plot

Cast          
Charles Starrett as Thad Lawson
Iris Meredith as Betty Webster
Bob Nolan as Bob 
Kenneth MacDonald as Jack Rand
Dick Curtis as Dirk Hogan
Wally Wales as Sheriff Jim Hanley
Bill Cody Jr. as Sliver 
Pat Brady as Pat 
Hugh Farr as Hugh 
Karl Farr as Karl 
Lloyd Perryman as Lloyd 
Tim Spencer as Tim

References

External links
 

1939 films
1930s English-language films
American Western (genre) films
1939 Western (genre) films
Columbia Pictures films
Films directed by Joseph H. Lewis
American black-and-white films
1930s American films